William Maree was a state legislator in South Carolina. He represented Colleton County in the South Carolina House of Representatives from 1876 to 1880 52nd and 53rd General Assemblies.

He had a son William C. Maree and four daughters, three became teachers and the fourth operated the family's tourist lodging.

He was an African American.

See also
African-American officeholders during and following the Reconstruction era

References

Year of birth missing
Year of death missing
People from Colleton County, South Carolina
Members of the South Carolina House of Representatives
African-American state legislators in South Carolina
African-American politicians during the Reconstruction Era